Raf, pseudonym of Joan (or Juan) Rafart i Roldán (Barcelona 22 November 1928 – 13 October 1997) was a Spanish comic author. He was part of the second generation the Bruguera school alongside Figueras, Gin, Ibáñez, Nadal, Segura, Martz Schmidt, and Vázquez.

Biography
He started making comics in the 1950s, when he was already married, with the series El Zorro. He soon abandoned the realistic art style in his works and concentrated on his more humorous style. He started collaborating in the magazine La Risa with series such as La vida aborregada de Gumersindo Borrego (1953), Levy Berzotas (1953) or  Cantinflas (1958)

His best-known works are those that he made since 1957 for the publisher Editorial Bruguera where he created many popular series such as Doña Lío Portapartes, señora con malas artes (1958) about a gossiping and envious woman, Don Pelmazo Bla, bla, bla... y las mil latas que da (1959) about a know-it-all who likes to give advice to people that always end in disaster and El Capitán Aparejo, zoquete como un cangrejo about an incompetent boat captain.

In 1959 Raf leaves Bruguera and works through the British agency Fleetway in magazines such as Film Funn (Tony Hancok) and Buster (Milkiway) for two years. Since 1965 he starts working for the Spanish magazine TBO with the pseudonym "Roldán".

In the late 1960s, he returns to Bruguera where he created Doña Tecla Bisturín, enfermera de postín (1968) about a bossy nurse in a crazy clinic or Manolón, conductor de camión (1969) about a truck driver. There he created his most famous character, Sir Tim O'Theo (1970) about an old British detective wannabe who is helped by his much more competent butler Patson.

In 1986 he created the series Mirlowe y Violeta, a hardboiled parody, about a short Bogart-wannabe detective and his tall, fat and highly competent female assistant. For the magazine "Creepy" he created the series Zomby y el gato (1990) a horror parody and for the satirical magazine "Puta Mili" the adult series La fragata capadora (1992)

He died on 13 October 1997 of a cardiac complication.

Series

References

External links 
Raf in Lambiek Comiclopedia

1928 births
1997 deaths
Spanish comics artists
Spanish comics writers